Barrie Bates (born 17 October 1969) is a former Welsh darts player who played on the Professional Darts Corporation (PDC) circuit. His original nickname was Batesy, but since 2007, he was known as Champagne.

Career
Bates made his PDC televised debut at the 2003 UK Open reaching the third round. In 2005 he narrowly lost a last-32 match to Lionel Sams at the UK Open and made a superb run to the final in 2006 before losing to Raymond van Barneveld.

He made a great impression on the circuit in 2006, winning the John Smiths Singles in February and May's Le Skratch Sarantos Retsinas Memorial event in Montreal. He also reached two Regional Finals of the UK Open in March (losing to Chris Mason and to van Barneveld in November. He reached two PDPA Players Championship finals in 2006 losing to Colin Lloyd in the Isle of Wight in June, but beat Phil Taylor to take his biggest title to date in the Netherlands event in November.

His success at events away from the television cameras during 2006 helped him to win the award of "Best Floor Player" at the first PDC Awards Dinner. It refers to the non-televised events which feature many boards alongside each other on a smaller arena floor.

He made his World Championship debut in 2007 as the number 17 seed but suffered a surprise first-round defeat to Canadian Brian Cyr. In the 2008 World Championship, Bates got to the third round only to lose to Kirk Shepherd. In the 2009 tournament, Bates defeated Northern Ireland's Felix McBrearty and American Bill Davis to reach the third round again, this time meeting Mark Dudbridge, winning 4–0 with checkout percentage of 60% to reach the quarter finals for the very first time. He lost in the quarters, however, falling to twelfth seed Mervyn King by five sets to two.

In 2010, he represented Wales in the inaugural PDC World Cup of Darts alongside Mark Webster, where despite losing all seven singles in which he competed in, he and Webster reached the final, after defeating New Zealand, Spain, Scotland and Australia (thanks to Bates' 116 checkout in the sudden death leg), before losing to the Netherlands pairing of Raymond van Barneveld and Co Stompé.

In January 2019, after several years struggling with injury and playing his darts on the PDC Challenge Tour, Bates won back his PDC Tour Card for the first time since 2012. He squeezed into the top eleven of the UK Q-School Order of Merit to seal a two-year Tour Card.

2020
Since July 12 he has not participated in any darts event.

World Championship results

PDC

2007: 1st Round (lost to Brian Cyr 2–3)
2008: 3rd Round (lost to Kirk Shepherd 2–4)
2009: Quarter-Finals (lost to Mervyn King 2–5)
2010: 2nd Round (lost to Kevin McDine 0–4)
2011: 1st Round (lost to Kevin McDine 1–3)

Career statistics

(W) Won; (F) finalist; (SF) semifinalist; (QF) quarterfinalist; (#R) rounds 6, 5, 4, 3, 2, 1; (RR) round-robin stage; (Prel.) Preliminary round; (DNQ) Did not qualify; (DNP) Did not participate; (NH) Not held

Performance timeline

PDC major finals: 1 (1 runner-up)

PDC team finals: 1 (1 runner-up)

References

External links

1969 births
Living people
Welsh darts players
Professional Darts Corporation former tour card holders
PDC ranking title winners
PDC World Cup of Darts Welsh team